Seán O'Brien (born 31 July 2000) is an American born Irish rugby union player, currently playing for Pro14 and European Rugby Champions Cup side Leinster. His preferred position is flanker.

Leinster
O'Brien was named in the Leinster Rugby academy for the 2020–21 season. He made his debut in Round 15 of the 2020–21 Pro14 against .

References

External links
itsrugby.co.uk Profile

2000 births
Living people
Sportspeople from Pittsburgh
Irish rugby union players
Leinster Rugby players
Rugby union flankers
LA Giltinis players